Patrick Ness (born 17 October 1971) is an American-British author, journalist, lecturer, and screenwriter. Born in the United States, Ness moved to London and holds dual citizenship. He is best known for his books for young adults, including the Chaos Walking trilogy and A Monster Calls.

Ness won the annual Carnegie Medal in 2011 and in 2012, for Monsters of Men and A Monster Calls.
He is one of seven writers to win two Medals, and the second to win consecutively.

He wrote the screenplay of the 2016 film adaptation of A Monster Calls, and was the creator and writer of the Doctor Who spin-off series Class.

Early life
Ness was born near the Fort Belvoir Army base, near Alexandria, Virginia, where his father was a lieutenant in the US Army. They moved to Hawaii, where he lived until he was six, then spent the next ten years in Washington state, before moving to Los Angeles. Ness studied English Literature at the University of Southern California.

After graduating, he worked as corporate writer for a cable company. He published his first story in Genre magazine in 1997 and was working on his first novel when he moved to London in 1999.

Career
Ness's first novel, The Crash of Hennington, was published in 2003, and was followed by his short story collection, Topics About Which I Know Nothing, in 2004.

Ness's first young adult novel was The Knife of Never Letting Go. It won the Guardian Children's Fiction Prize in 2008.
The book was followed by The Ask and the Answer, and Monsters of Men. Together, the three books make up the Chaos Walking trilogy. Ness has also written three short stories set in the Chaos Walking universe; the prequels "The New World" and "The Wide, Wide Sea", and "Snowscape", which is set after the events of Monsters of Men. The short stories are available as free-to-download e-books, and have been included in the 2013 UK print editions of the novels.

A Monster Calls originated with the Irish writer, Siobhan Dowd. Dowd had been diagnosed with cancer and was unable to complete the story before she died in 2007. Dowd and Ness shared an editor at Walker, Denise Johnstone-Burt, and after Dowd's death, Walker arranged for Ness to complete the story from her notes. Ness says his only guideline was to write a book he thought Dowd would have liked. Jim Kay was hired to illustrate the book, and the two completed the book without meeting. Ness won the Carnegie and Kay won the companion Kate Greenaway Medal, the first time one book has won both medals.

On 7 May 2013, Ness was revealed to be the author of Tip of the Tongue, the May e-short featuring the Fifth Doctor and Nyssa as part Puffin's eleven Doctor Who e-shorts in honour of the show's 50th anniversary.

His fourth young adult novel, More Than This, was published on 5 September 2013. It later made the Carnegie Medal shortlist of 2015.

The Crane Wife, Ness's third novel for adults, was published on 30 December 2014.

In 2014, Ness delivered the keynote speech at the Children's and Young Adult Program of the Berlin International Literature Festival.

The Rest of Us Just Live Here, was published 25 August 2015 in the UK, Ireland, Australia, and New Zealand, and 5 October 2015 in Canada and the United States.

On 1 October 2015, the BBC announced that Ness would be writing a Doctor Who spin-off entitled Class. The resulting eight-part series aired on BBC Three's online channel toward the end of 2016. The BBC cancelled Class after one series.

Release, was published on 4 May 2017, described by Ness as a "private and intense book" with more personal inspiration than any before it.

In June 2021, Ness was said to be preparing a prequel script to the Napoleonic sea adventure movie Master and Commander: The Far Side of the World, based on the works of Patrick O'Brian.

Personal life
Ness was naturalised as a British citizen in 2005. He entered into a civil partnership with his partner in 2006, less than two months after the Civil Partnership Act came into force. In February 2023, Patrick disclosed on Instagram that he had married author Nick Coveney in Vegas in October 2022. He also stated that within the previous "4 or 5 years" he had gotten divorced.

Ness taught creative writing at Oxford University and has written and reviewed for The Daily Telegraph, The Times Literary Supplement, The Sunday Telegraph and The Guardian. He has been a Fellow of the Royal Literary Fund, and was the first Writer in Residence for Booktrust.

Awards

The Knife of Never Letting Go won numerous awards including the Booktrust Teenage Prize, the Guardian Children's Fiction Prize, and the 2008 Tiptree Award. It was shortlisted for the Carnegie Medal.

The Ask and the Answer won the 2009 Costa Book Award in the children's book category. It, too, made the Carnegie shortlist.

Monsters of Men won the CILIP Carnegie Medal and was shortlisted for the 2011 Arthur C. Clarke Award.

More Than This made the Carnegie shortlist.

The Rest of Us Just Live Here received many awards, including six starred reviews and the Kirkus Best Book of the Year.

Works

Novels

Novels for young adults

Chaos Walking series 
 The Knife of Never Letting Go (2008)
 The Ask and the Answer (2009)
 Monsters of Men (2010)
Short stories
 1.5. "The New World" (2009)
 2.5. "The Wide, Wide Sea" (2013)
 3.5. "Snowscape" (2013)

Standalone 
 
 
 
  (2017)

Short stories
 "Different for Boys", collected in Losing it (2010)
 "Doctor Who: Tip of the Tongue" (2013), collected in Thirteen Doctors, 13 Stories (2019)
 "This Whole Demoing Thing", collected in Monstrous Affections: An Anthology of Beastly Tales, ed. Kelly Link and Gavin J. Grant (2014)

Collections
 Topics About Which I Know Nothing (2004), collection of 11 short stories:
 "Implied Violence", "The Way All Trends Do", "Ponce de Leon is a Retired Married Couple From Toronto", "Jesus' Elbows and Other Christian Urban Myths", "Quis Custodiet Ipsos Custodes?", "Sydney is a City of Jaywalkers", "2,115 Opportunities", "The Motivations of Sally Rae Wentworth, Amazon", "The Seventh International Military War Games Dance Committee Quadrennial Competition and Jamboree", "The Gifted", "Now That You've Died"

Filmography

See also

Notes

References

External links/sources
 
 
 
 
 The Knife Of Never Letting Go, chapter one
 Opening speech by Ness at the children and youth program of the International Literature Festival Berlin

1971 births
21st-century American novelists
21st-century British novelists
21st-century American screenwriters
21st-century British screenwriters
21st-century American short story writers
21st-century British short story writers
People from Fairfax County, Virginia
American children's writers
American emigrants to England
American male novelists
British journalists
Carnegie Medal in Literature winners
American gay writers
Guardian Children's Fiction Prize winners
British LGBT journalists
American LGBT journalists
American LGBT novelists
LGBT people from Virginia
British LGBT writers
Living people
Naturalised citizens of the United Kingdom
People from Fort Belvoir, Virginia
University of Southern California alumni
Writers of young adult science fiction
Novelists from Virginia
Screenwriters from Virginia
21st-century American male writers